Apolinario is both a Portuguese and Spanish given name and a surname, derived from the Latin Apollinaris. Notable people with the name include:

Given names
Apolinario Belisle Gómez (born 1966), Belizean marathon runner
Apolinario de la Cruz (1815–1841), Filipino religious leader
Apolinário de Silveira (born 1965), Angolan boxer
Apolinario Mabini (1864–1903), Filipino revolutionary leader
Apolinário Paquete (born 1968), Angolan basketball coach

Middle names
Guillermo Apolinario Vilas (born 1952), Argentine former tennis player
Joelinton Cassio Apolinário de Lira (born 1996), Brazilian footballer
Jose Apolinario Lozada (1950–2018), Filipino diplomat and politician
Manuel Apolinario Odria (1896–1974), the 45th president of Peru
Valter Apolinario Da Silva (born 1977), Brazilian basketball player

Surnames
Alejandro Rodríguez Apolinario (1892–1972), Spanish footballer
Alex Apolinário (1996–2021), Brazilian footballer
Dave Apolinario (born 1999), Filipino boxer
Joel Apolinario, founder of Kapa and the culprit of its investment scam

See also
Apolinario Mabini Shrine (Manila), a historic site in Santa Mesa, Manila, Philippines
Apolinario Mabini Superhighway, a controlled-access toll expressway in Batangas, Philippines
Apolinario Saravia, Salta, a town and municipality in Salta Province, Argentina
BRP Apolinario Mabini (PS-36), a Jacinto-class corvette of the Philippine Navy
BRP Felix Apolinario (PC-395), a Jose Andrada-class patrol craft of the Philippine Navy

Portuguese masculine given names
Spanish masculine given names
Portuguese-language surnames
Spanish-language surnames